Rayleigh railway station is on the Shenfield to Southend Line in the East of England, serving the town of Rayleigh, Essex. The Engineer's Line Reference for the line is SSV; the station's three-letter station code is RLG. Each of the two platforms has an operational length for 12-coach trains.

History 
The line from Wickford to Southend including Rayleigh station was opened on 1 October 1889 by the Great Eastern Railway. There was a goods yard to the west of the station, on the 'up' (London-bound) side, including a goods shed and cattle pens. There was a signal box on the 'down' (country-bound) platform, which was closed in 1938 with the introduction of colour light signalling. Electrification of the Shenfield to Southend Victoria line using 1.5 kV DC overhead electrification was completed on 31 December 1956. That was changed to 6.25 kV AC in November 1960 and to 25 kV AC in January 1979.

To the west of the station there was a private halt called Bridge 774, which was used from May 1922 to April 1925 during construction work on the Southend Arterial Road. To the east of the station there was a siding called Downhall, associated with a brickworks, which had been decommissioned by 1968.

Location and services
Rayleigh station is currently managed by Greater Anglia, which also operates all trains serving the station.

It is a small station with a ticket office but no barriers. When the ticket office is closed, access to the platforms is available through a gate to the left of the building. Outside the station there is a taxi rank, car park, bus stops and a newsagent. The town centre is a short, uphill walk from the station.

At peak times, service frequencies may be increased and calling patterns varied.

References

External links 

Transport in Rochford District
Railway stations in Essex
DfT Category C2 stations
Former Great Eastern Railway stations
Greater Anglia franchise railway stations
Railway station
William Neville Ashbee railway stations
Railway stations in Great Britain opened in 1889